"From the Sea" is a song by Australian rock band Eskimo Joe, released on 22 March 2004 as the lead single from their second studio album, A Song Is a City (2004). It was their most successful single at that time, reaching number 33 on the Australian ARIA Singles Chart. At the ARIA Music Awards of 2004, the song was nominated for ARIA Award for Single of the Year, and it was also ranked number three on Triple J's 2004 Hottest 100.

Track listing

Charts

Release history

References

Eskimo Joe songs
2004 singles
2004 songs
Festival Records singles
Songs written by Stuart MacLeod (musician)
Songs written by Joel Quartermain
Songs written by Kavyen Temperley